In Greek mythology, the name Chryse ( or  "golden") may refer to:

Chryse, an Arcadian princess as the daughter of Pallas, son of King Lycaon. She was the wife of Dardanus and became the mother of his sons, Idaeus and Deimas.
Chryse, a Minyan princess as the daughter of King Almus of Orchomenus and sister of Chrysogeneia. She was the lover of Ares and mother of Phlegyas.
Chryse, a nymph or minor goddess of Lemnos (or of Chryse Island) who lured Philoctetes away from his companions which resulted in him being bitten by a snake. Some sources state that Chryse was a local epithet of Athena, and the misfortune happened to Philoctetes next to her altar, which the snake was guarding. The altar was said to have been set up by Jason.
Chryse, daughter of Timander, sister of Eurytione, Hellotis and Cottyto, from Corinth.
Chryse, a surname of Aphrodite on Lesbos.

Notes

References 

 Dionysus of Halicarnassus, Roman Antiquities. English translation by Earnest Cary in the Loeb Classical Library, 7 volumes. Harvard University Press, 1937-1950. Online version at Bill Thayer's Web Site
 Dionysius of Halicarnassus, Antiquitatum Romanarum quae supersunt, Vol I-IV. . Karl Jacoby. In Aedibus B.G. Teubneri. Leipzig. 1885. Greek text available at the Perseus Digital Library.
 Gaius Julius Hyginus, Fabulae from The Myths of Hyginus translated and edited by Mary Grant. University of Kansas Publications in Humanistic Studies. Online version at the Topos Text Project.
 Pausanias, Description of Greece with an English Translation by W.H.S. Jones, Litt.D., and H.A. Ormerod, M.A., in 4 Volumes. Cambridge, MA, Harvard University Press; London, William Heinemann Ltd. 1918. . Online version at the Perseus Digital Library
 Pausanias, Graeciae Descriptio. 3 vols. Leipzig, Teubner. 1903.  Greek text available at the Perseus Digital Library.
 Philostratus the Elder. Imagines, translated by Arthur Fairbanks (1864-1944). Loeb Classical Library Volume 256. London: William Heinemann, 1931. Online version at the Topos Text Project.
 Philostratus the Lemnian (Philostratus Major), Flavii Philostrati Opera. Vol 2. Carl Ludwig Kayser. in aedibus B. G. Teubneri. Lipsiae. 1871. Greek text available at the Perseus Digital Library.
 Sophocles, The Philoctetes of Sophocles edited with introduction and notes by Sir Richard Jebb. Cambridge. Cambridge University Press. 1893. Online version at the Perseus Digital Library.
 Sophocles, Sophocles. Vol 2: Ajax. Electra. Trachiniae. Philoctetes with an English translation by F. Storr. The Loeb classical library, 21. Francis Storr. London; New York. William Heinemann Ltd.; The Macmillan Company. 1913. Greek text available at the Perseus Digital Library.
Princesses in Greek mythology
Nymphs

Women of Ares
Arcadian characters in Greek mythology
Arcadian mythology
Epithets of Aphrodite
Epithets of Athena